KGOT (101.3 FM) is a commercial Top 40 (CHR) radio station in Anchorage, Alaska. Its transmitter is located off Dowling Road in Southeast Anchorage.

The station, first under its original call letters of KYAK-FM and later as KGOT, was largely known in the Anchorage radio market for its decades-long association with disc jockey Larry Wayne (who also had a stint during this time at KENI when it was a Top 40 station).  Wayne became a born-again Christian during his time at the station and later hosted a gospel music show on Sundays.  After leaving Anchorage, he became better known due to his association with Air 1 and K-Love.

KGOT started using the moniker "Alaska's #1 Hit Music Station" in 1996 under the Program Director Paul Walker.  The station was #1 in the market for many years in the late 1990s and early 2000s.  Some important talent included Scott & Stu for many years into the 21st century.  The station still identifies as "Alaska's #1 hit music station today.

Programming
Weekdays: Josh Martinez (overnights), Casey B and Malie (mornings),  Ryan Seacrest (middays), Billy The Kidd (afternoons), EJ (evenings)
Saturdays: Gabby Diaz (overnights), Elizabethany (mornings), Enrique Santos (mid-middays), Letty B (mid-middays), Billy The Kidd (afternoons), Romeo (evenings), DJ Grooves (evenings)
Sundays: Gabby Diaz (overnights), Elizabethany (mornings), Ryan Seacrest (middays), Letty B (middays), Brady (Afternoons), JoJo Wright (nights), Tanya and EJ (overnights)

Previous logo

References

External links
 
 

1975 establishments in Alaska
Contemporary hit radio stations in the United States
IHeartMedia radio stations
Radio stations established in 1975
GOT